The COVID-19 pandemic reached the province of Shanxi, China.

Statistics

Timeline

2020
On January 22, the first confirmed case of pneumonia with a new type of coronavirus infection appeared in Shanxi Province, and six close contacts have been tracked and medically observed.

2021
On January 3, Shanxi Province added 1 newly imported confirmed case (imported from Poland).

2022
On January 22, Yungang District of Datong City conducted a nucleic acid test on a returnee from Fengtai District of Beijing, and the result was positive. In the early morning of January 23, the results of the review by the Municipal Center for Disease Control and Prevention and the Fourth People's Hospital of the Municipality were all positive.

References

COVID-19 pandemic in China by province
COVID-19 pandemic in mainland China
History of Shanxi
Health in Shanxi
zh:2019冠狀病毒病山西省疫情